Anthony Walton (born 1960) is  an American poet and writer.  He is perhaps best known as the author of a chapbook of poems, Cricket Weather and for his non-fiction work Mississippi: An American Journey.  His work has appeared widely in magazines, journals, and anthologies, including The New Yorker, Kenyon Review, Oxford American, and Rainbow Darkness. He is currently a professor and the writer-in-residence at Bowdoin College in Brunswick, Maine.

Early life 
Walton grew up in Aurora, Illinois.  He studied at the University of Notre Dame and received an M.F.A. from Brown University.

Literary career 
In 1989, Walton wrote an essay for the New York Times Magazine, "Willie Horton and Me," concerning  race issues of the time.  Walton won a Whiting Award in 1998 in fiction.  He contributed to By J. Peder Zane's 2004 Remarkable Reads: 34 Writers and Their Adventures in Reading.

Works 
Every Shut Eye Aint Asleep: Anthology Of Poetry by African Americans Since 1945 (Editor) 1994
Cricket Weather 1995
Go and Tell Pharaoh with Reverend Al Sharpton, 1996
Mississippi: An American Journey 1997
The Vintage Book of African American Poetry (Editor) 2002
Brothers In Arms: The Epic Story of the 761st Tank Battalion, WWII's Forgotten Heroes with Kareem Abdul-Jabbar, 2004.

References

External links
Official Website (under construction)
 Audio of Anthony Walton reading his poems
Walton's 1989 essay, Willie Horton and Me
Walton's 1999 essay, Technology vs. African Americans
Walton's 2001 essay, To Be Led by a Teacher
Walton's 2003 essay, With Freedom and Justice for All
Profile at The Whiting Foundation

1960 births
American male poets
Bowdoin College faculty
Brown University alumni
Living people
University of Notre Dame alumni
Chapbook writers
21st-century American poets
21st-century American male writers